Mark McKenna (born 5 May 1996) is an Irish actor, musician, and singer. He is mostly known for having starred in the film Sing Street and the YouTube Premium/Amazon Prime series Wayne.

Career
McKenna made his film debut in 2016 in Sing Street. He was the lead singer/guitarist in the band The Girl Talk. McKenna is now the lead singer/guitarist in the band Milk. McKenna landed his first lead role in the American television series Wayne, which premiered on 16 January 2019.
McKenna posts demos under the name LOVERBOY on SoundCloud starting in 2016. On 16 November 2019, it was announced that he would play the role of Simon on the NBC pilot for One of Us Is Lying, based on the bestselling mystery novel by Karen M. McManus.

Filmography

Film

Television

Discography

With The Girl Talk

Extended plays

Singles

Promotional singles

With milk.

Extended plays

Singles

Mark McKenna

Promotional singles

As LOVERBOY

Promotional singles

References

External links
 
 
 

1996 births
Living people
21st-century Irish male actors
Irish male film actors
Irish male television actors
Irish male singers
Male actors from Dublin (city)